The 2021 Cavalry FC season was the third season in the history of Cavalry FC.

Current squad 
As of August 31, 2021

Transfers

In

Loans in

Draft picks 
Cavalry FC selected the following players in the 2021 CPL–U Sports Draft on January 29, 2021. Draft picks are not automatically signed to the team roster. Only those who are signed to a contract will be listed as transfers in.

Out

Loans out

Competitions

Canadian Premier League

Table

Results by match

Matches

Playoff matches

Canadian Championship

Statistics

Squad and statistics

Goalkeepers

References

External links 
2021 Cavalry FC season at Official Site

2021
2021 Canadian Premier League
Canadian soccer clubs 2021 season